Crypto API may refer to:

 Crypto API (Linux)
 Microsoft CryptoAPI